Helen Gilmore (born Antoinette A. Field, c. 1872 – April 1936) was an American actress of the stage and silent motion pictures from Louisville, Kentucky. She appeared in over 140 films between 1913 and 1932.

Early life and career
In approximately 1872, Gilmore was born to Richard Field and Mary Cilia Daniels. In 1894, she toured with comic actor Stuart Robson's company, even substituting, on at least one occasion, for Mrs. Robson—the temporarily unavailable May Waldron—in the role of Adriana in Shakespeare's A Comedy of Errors. It was during that tour that Gilmore met and married fellow cast member (and fellow Kentuckian), Joseph B. Zahner, hurriedly tying the knot at New York's City Hall on Friday, July 13. Scarcely five years later, Zahner, then 33, suffered a fatal heart attack.

Between 1910 and 1913, Gilmore appeared on Broadway in 4 musical revues: Deems Taylor's The Echo, Manuel Klein's Around the World and Under All Flags (both at the New York Hippodrome), and Oscar Straus's My Little Friend. Shortly thereafter, she made her screen debut in A Female Fagin. 

As Mrs. Hobbs in A Petticoat Pilot (1918), Gilmore was commended for her careful character study. The Paramount Pictures film was directed by Rollin S. Sturgeon and was based on the novel by Evelyn Lincoln. She played the head nurse in Too Much Business (1922). This was a comedy which originated with a Saturday Evening Post story by Earl Derr Biggers. In it Gilmore was cast with Elsa Lorimer and Mack Fenton. Her final motion picture credit is for the role of a motorist in the Laurel and Hardy short Two Tars (1928).

Theatre performances

Filmography 

 A Female Fagin (1913) – The Female Fagin
 Notoriety (1914) (as Helen Field Gilmore)
 A Mexican Warrior (1914) – The Warrior's Mother-in-Law
 The Eagle's Mate (1914) – Hagar Morne (as Helen Gillmore)
 The Earl of Pawtucket (1915) – Aunt Jane Putnam
 This Way Out (1916)
 Their Wedding Day (1916) – Mrs. Findem
 The Rivals (1916 film) (1916) – The Lumber King's Wife
 The Pretenders (1916)
 Never Again (1916) – Mrs. Dale
 For Better or Worse (1916) – Mrs. Gothrox
 Will a Woman Tell? (1916) – 
 Wait a Minute (1916) – Jane Higgs
 Life Savers (1916) – Old Maid
 Comrades (1916) – The Landlady
 The Reward (1916) – Mabel's Mother
 A Bag of Trouble (1916) – Mrs. Pokes
 Jerry's Double Header (1916) – Mother
 Jerry's Winning Way (1917) – The Landlady
 Jerry's Big Doings (1917) – The Mother
 Jerry's Brilliant Scheme (1917) – Her Mother
 Jerry's Romance (1917) – Lady Isabelle
 The Flying Target (1917) – Jane
 Jerry's Triple Alliance (1917) – The Housekeeper
 Tom Sawyer (1917) – Widow Douglas
 A Petticoat Pilot (1918) – Mrs. Hobbs
 Huck and Tom (1918) – Widow Douglas
 On the Jump (1918) – Girl's Mother
 Follow the Crowd (1918) – 
 Pipe the Whiskers (1918)
 It's a Wild Life (1918) 
 Hey There! (1918)
 Kicked Out (1918) 
 Two-Gun Gussie (1918) – (uncredited)
 The City Slicker (1918)
 Sic 'Em, Towser (1918) 
 Are Crooks Dishonest? (1918) – Old lady in park
 An Ozark Romance (1918) 
 Kicking the Germ Out of Germany (1918) – 
 That's Him (1918) 
 Bride and Gloom (1918) – 
 Two Scrambled (1918) 
 Bees in His Bonnet (1918)
 Why Pick on Me? (1918) – 
 Nothing But Trouble (1918) – 
 Take a Chance (1918) – Landlady (uncredited)
 Ring Up the Curtain (1919) – Manager's Wife (uncredited)
 Just Neighbors (1919) – Old Woman with Packages (uncredited)
 Bumping Into Broadway (1919) – 'Bearcat' the Landlady 
 Captain Kidd's Kids (1919) – The Girl's Mother
 From Hand to Mouth (1919) – Hag (uncredited)
 His Royal Slyness (1920) – Queen of Thermosa (uncredited)
 A Bashful Bigamist (1920) – Uncle Oswald's Wife 
 Fickle Women (1920) – Mrs. Cullison
 Down Home (1920) – Townswoman
 The Blazing Trail (1921) – Village Talking Machine
 Judge Her Not (1921) – Jerusha Spriggins
 Dangerous Paths (1921) – Deborah Hammond
 Never Weaken (1921)
 Too Much Business (1922) – The Head Nurse
 Impulse (1922) – Mrs. Cameron
 One Terrible Day (1922) – Carlene Culpepper (uncredited)
 Our Gang (1922) – Emil's Wife (uncredited)
 Good Men and True (1922) – Mrs. Fite
 Newly Rich (1922) 
 Tight Shoes (1923) 
 Safety Last! (1923) – Department Store Customer (uncredited)
 Boys to Board (1923) – Mother Malone
 Kill or Cure (1923) – Aggressive non-customer
 Post No Bills (1923)  
 No Noise (1923) – Nurse
 Jus' Passin' Through (1923)
 Stage Fright (1923) – Mickey's Mother
 The Whole Truth (1923) – The Wife
 Sunday Calm (1923) – Mrs. McTeeter
 Mother's Joy (1923) – Dippy
 It's a Joy! (1923) – His Mother-in-Law
 The Cowboy Sheik (1924) – Gussie the Cook
 Just a Minute (1924) – Caroline - the Mayor's Wife
 Postage Due (1924) 
 The Fraidy Cat (1924) – Lem Tucker's Mother 
 Zeb vs. Paprika (1924) 
 Seein' Things (1924) – Baby's Mother
 Commencement Day (1924) – Joe's Mother
 Near Dublin (1924) – Villager
 April Fool (1924) – Jackie's Mother
 Stolen Goods (1924) – Shopper (uncredited)
 Our Congressman (1924) – The Dowager Lady Hemingway Abbott
 It's a Bear (1924) – Farmer's Wife
 Short Kilts (1924) – Mrs. McHungry
 Sittin' Pretty (1924) – Undetermined secondary role (uncredited)
 Should Landlords Live? (1924)
 Every Man for Himself (1924) – Pedestrian 
 Bungaloo Boobs (1924) – The Neighbor's Wife
 Fast Company (1924) – Woman from Traveler's Aid Society
 All Wet (1924) – Boarding House Landlady (uncredited)
 Meet the Missus (1924)  
 The Wages of Tin (1925) – Meg's Mother
 The Rat's Knuckles (1925) – Diner (uncredited)
 The Big Town (1925) – Train Passenger (uncredited)
 The Haunted Honeymoon (1925) 
 The Love Bug (1925) – Beauty Parlor Customer
 Whose Baby Are You? (1925) – Train Passenger (uncredited)
 Big Red Riding Hood (1925) – Book Buyer / Red Riding Hood in Fantasy
 Wild Papa (1925)
 Chasing the Chaser (1925) – The Neighbor
 Sherlock Sleuth (1925) – Haughty Guest's Wife
 Tame Men and Wild Women (1925) – Arthur's Mother
 Mary, Queen of Tots (1925) – Dollmaker's wife
 Unfriendly Enemies (1925) – Laughing Woman
 Moonlight and Noses (1925) 
 Should Sailors Marry? (1925) – Train Passenger
 Laughing Ladies (1925) 
 Starvation Blues (1925) 
 His Wooden Wedding (1925) – Dressmaker (uncredited)
 Tol'able Romeo (1925)
 What's the World Coming To? (1926) – A Neighbor
 Your Husband's Past (1926)
 Madame Mystery (1926) 
 Baby Clothes (1926) – Joe's Mother 
 Say It with Babies (1926)
 Don Key (Son of Burro) (1926)
 Long Fliv the King (1926) – Helga's Lady-in-Waiting (uncredited)
 Never Too Old (1926)
 Merry Widower (1926)
 Should Husbands Pay? (1926)
 Sensation Seekers (1927)
 Mad Scrambles (1927) 
 The Eyes Have It (1928) 
 Idle Eyes (1928)
 Their Purple Moment (1928)
 Seein' Things (1928)
 Two Tars (1928) – Motorist
 Shivering Shakespeare (1930) – Woman in Audience (uncredited)
 The Real McCoy (1930) – Townswoman (uncredited)
 Any Old Port! (1932) – Spectator (uncredited)

References

Further reading
 "Married a Louisville Actress". The Louisville Courier-General. July 15, 1894. p. 6
 Von Harleman, G.P. (February 3, 1917). "News of Los Angeles and Vicinity". The Moving Picture World. Vol. 31. p. 693
 "Stories of the Films; Vim: 'Life Savers,' 'Comrades'". The Moving Picture World. August 19, 1916. p.1296
 "Current Feature Photoplays Passed in Review: 'Tom Sawyer'". Dramatic Mirror of Motion Pictures and the Stage. December 15, 1917. p. 18
 "Notes: The Helen Gilmore-Bert Baker Litigation". Variety. November 8, 1918. p. 16
 "News of the Films". The Billboard. March 3, 1922. p. 43
 Russell, Marion (May 20, 1922). "Too Much Business". The Billboard. p. 98
 "It Doesn't Always Pay to Get Thin". St. Louis Post-Dispatch. October 5, 1930. p. 13

External links
 

1870s births
1936 deaths
19th-century American actresses
20th-century American actresses
American silent film actresses
American stage actresses
American film actresses
Actresses from Louisville, Kentucky